Hills of Hate may refer to:
 Hills of Hate (1926 film), an Australian silent film
 Hills of Hate (1921 film), an American silent Western film